Monteils is the name or part of the name of several communes in France:

 Monteils, in the Aveyron department
 Monteils, in the Gard department
 Monteils, in the Tarn-et-Garonne department

See also
 Monteille, in the Calvados department
 Le Monteil (disambiguation)